Jan Jonas Jakob "Janne" Eriksson (born 24 August 1967) is a Swedish former professional footballer who played as a defender. Starting off his career with IFK Sundsvall in the mid-1980s, he went on to play professionally in Sweden, Germany, Switzerland, England, and the United States before retiring in 1999. A full international between 1990 and 1994, he won 35 caps for the Sweden national team and participated at the 1990 FIFA World Cup and UEFA Euro 1992. He was also selected for the 1994 FIFA World Cup but had to withdraw because of an injury. He was the recipient of the 1992 Guldbollen as Sweden's best footballer of the year.

Club career 
Eriksson played his early football with GIF Sundsvall and IFK Sundsvall before signing with AIK in 1987. In 1992, he signed with IFK Norrköping before moving to the German Bundesliga to play for 1. FC Kaiserslautern. He was awarded Guldbollen in 1992 while playing in Kaiserslautern. He briefly returned to AIK in 1994 before going on to represent Servette FC and Helsingborgs IF between 1995 and 1996.

Eriksson joined English side Sunderland in January 1997, but went on to make only one appearance for the club in a 1–0 defeat at Aston Villa in February 1997. He left the club in May 1998 having made no further appearances. He spent the last two years of his professional career with the Tampa Bay Mutiny in Major League Soccer alongside his former Sweden teammate Thomas Ravelli.

International career 
He played 35 matches and scored four goals for the Sweden national team. Two of those goals came at the 1992 European Championship in Sweden. He was selected for the 1990 FIFA World Cup squad, but did not play. Eriksson was also selected for the Swedish 1994 FIFA World Cup squad but had to leave the team just before the start of the tournament because of an injury and was replaced by Teddy Lucic.

Personal life 
Eriksson's father Jan-Åke Eriksson and younger brother Patrik Eriksson-Ohlsson are also former footballers.

Career statistics

International 

Scores and results list Sweden's goal tally first, score column indicates score after each Eriksson goal.

Honours 
Individual

 Guldbollen: 1992
 Stor grabb: 1992

References

External links
 
 

Living people
1967 births
Expatriate footballers in England
Expatriate footballers in Germany
Expatriate footballers in Switzerland
Expatriate soccer players in the United States
Swedish expatriate sportspeople in Germany
Swedish expatriate sportspeople in Switzerland
Swedish expatriate sportspeople in the United Kingdom
Swedish expatriate sportspeople in the United States
AIK Fotboll players
IFK Norrköping players
1. FC Kaiserslautern players
Servette FC players
Sunderland A.F.C. players
Helsingborgs IF players
Tampa Bay Mutiny players
1990 FIFA World Cup players
Allsvenskan players
Premier League players
Bundesliga players
Sweden international footballers
Sweden under-21 international footballers
Sweden youth international footballers
Swedish expatriate footballers
Swedish footballers
UEFA Euro 1992 players
People from Sundsvall
Major League Soccer players
Major League Soccer All-Stars
Association football defenders
Sportspeople from Västernorrland County